A referendum was held on 8 March 1975 in the Australian state of Western Australia on the topic of introducing daylight saving. It was the first of four such proposals which have been put to Western Australian voters, and followed a trial over the 1974–1975 summer, from 27 October 1974 until 2 March 1975. The referendum failed to pass, with 53.66% voting against the proposal.

Referendum results 
Question: Are you in favour of the standard time in the State being advanced one hour from the last Sunday in October in each year until the first Sunday in March next following?

References 

1975
1975 elections in Australia
1975 referendums
Daylight saving time in Australia
1970s in Western Australia
March 1975 events in Australia